Kévin Bérigaud (born 9 May 1988) is a French professional footballer who plays as a striker.

Career 
Born in Thonon-les-Bains, Bérigaud began his career playing in the academy of Swiss club Servette. He joined Football Croix-de-Savoie in 2005. In 2007, the year Bérigaud joined the first team, the club merged with Olympique Thonon Chablais to create Olympique Croix de Savoie. The club adopted the name of Evian Thonon Gaillard, or Evian for short, in 2009.

In January 2019, Bérigaud joined Latvian club Riga on loan.

Notes

References

External links

Living people
1988 births
French footballers
Association football forwards
Servette FC players
Thonon Evian Grand Genève F.C. players
Montpellier HSC players
Angers SCO players
Pafos FC players
Riga FC players
Championnat National players
Ligue 2 players
Ligue 1 players
Championnat National 3 players
Cypriot First Division players
French expatriate footballers
Expatriate footballers in Switzerland
Expatriate footballers in Cyprus
Expatriate footballers in Latvia
French expatriate sportspeople in Switzerland
French expatriate sportspeople in Cyprus
French expatriate sportspeople in Latvia
People from Thonon-les-Bains
Sportspeople from Haute-Savoie
Footballers from Auvergne-Rhône-Alpes